Serine/threonine-protein kinase 38 is an enzyme that in humans is encoded by the STK38 gene.

References

Further reading

External links 
 PDBe-KB provides an overview of all the structure information available in the PDB for Human Serine/threonine-protein kinase 38

EC 2.7.11